Shafiqul Islam Shimul (মোঃ শফিকুল ইসলাম শিমুল) is an Awami League politician and the incumbent Member of Parliament from Natore-2.

Early life
Shimul was born on 3 July 1976. He has an LLB degree.

Career
In July 2010, The Daily Star reported that Shariful Islam Ramjan and Shafiqul Islam Shimul, President and General Secretary of Natore District unit of Jubo League, controlled a syndicate that manipulated and controlled the tender process at Bangladesh Water Development Board. The syndicate was involved in corruption that harmed the dredging of rivers like Narod river in Natore District.

Shimul was elected to Parliament from Natore-2 on 5 January 2014 as a Awami League candidate. He was elected unopposed after the election was boycotted by all major opposition parties. In 2014, he was charged in a murder case but his name was later withdrawn from the charge sheet.

On 13 August 2015, Shimul and his supporters snatched a criminal, Redwan Sabbir, in handcuffs from Rapid Action Battalion custody after getting into a verbal argument with the law enforcement agency.

On 11 April 2016, Shimul's supports attacked a rebel candidate of Awami League who was standing for Halsa Union Parishad chairperson post. In October 2016, he claimed that he got Shafiqul Islam Ramjan elected chairperson of Natore Sadar Upazila on 17 February 2014.

Shimul campaigned for A. H. M. Khairuzzaman Liton for the Mayor of Rajshahi post in July 2018.

Shimul at the public rally on 17 December said that only those who vote for Awami League will be allowed to vote in the upcoming national elections on 30 December 2018. After his statements were published in the Prothom Alo his supports in Chhatra League prevented the distribution of newspaper in Natore District. He was re-elected from Natore-2 as a candidate of Awami League on 30 December 2018. He received 262,745 votes and his nearest rival, Sabina Yasmin of Bangladesh Nationalist Party, received 13,197 votes.

Shimul became a member of the parliamentary standing committee on Railways Ministry's sub committee formed to investigate tender manipulation at the Ministry of Railways in October 2020.

Shimul's nephew, Nafiul Islam Antar, was arrested for assaulting an engineer of Natore Water Development Board. Antar assaulted the engineer after he criticised a construction work for the Board completed by his father, Mir Amirul Islam Jahan, for poor quality. Nafiul Islam Antar is a contractor and leader of Bangladesh Awami Swechasebak League and his father is the treasurer of Natore District unit of Awami League.

References

Awami League politicians
Living people
1976 births
10th Jatiya Sangsad members
11th Jatiya Sangsad members